The Men's slalom competition of the Innsbruck 1964 Olympics was held on 8 February at Axamer Lizum.

The defending world champion was Charles Bozon of France.

Final

Source:

Qualifying

Round 1
The top 25 finishers advanced directly to the final, the others went to round two.

Round 2
The top 25 finishers advanced directly to the final, the others went to round two.

References 

Men's slalom
Winter Olympics